Baize is a coarse woollen cloth.

Baize may also refer to:

 1591 Baize, a main-belt asteroid
 Paul Baize (1901–1995), French pediatrician and amateur astronomer

See also

 Bai Ze
 Bays (disambiguation)
 Baze